Zakir Hossain may refer to:

Zakir Hossain - Bangladeshi ODI cricketer
Zakir Hossain Raju - Bangladeshi film director

See also
Zakir Hussain (disambiguation)